Meclofenoxate (INN, BAN; brand name Lucidril, also known as centrophenoxine) is a cholinergic nootropic used as a dietary supplement. It is an ester of dimethylethanolamine (DMAE) and 4-chlorophenoxyacetic acid (pCPA).

In elderly patients, meclofenoxate has been shown to improve performance on certain memory tests. Meclofenoxate also increases cellular membrane phospholipids. It is sold in Japan and some European countries, such as Germany, Hungary, and Austria, as a prescription drug.

Side effects
Meclofenoxate is considered to be safe and high in tolerability. However, possible side effects may include, rarely, insomnia, dizziness, restlessness, muscle tremor, depression, nausea, muscle tension, and headache; these side effects may be due to overdosage and may indicate the need for the dosage to be reduced.

Research
Meclofenoxate, as well as DMAE, have been found to increase the lifespans of mice by 26.5%.

Brand names
In addition to Lucidril, meclofenoxate has also been marketed under the brand names Amipolen, Analux, Brenal, Cellative, Centrophenoxin, Cerebron, Cerutil, Closete, Helfergin, Lucidryl, Lutiaron, Marucotol, Proserout, Proseryl, and Ropoxyl. In the US, meclofenoxate is sold as a dietary supplement, although it is an unapproved drug.

See also 

 Adafenoxate
 Cyprodenate
 ISRIB

References 

Dimethylamino compounds
Antidementia agents
Carboxylate esters
Chloroarenes
Cholinergics
Nootropics
Phenol ethers